Live at Brixton Academy (released as Dido Live on Region 1) is a live album and DVD set by Dido, released on 2005. It was recorded over three nights in August 2004, at Brixton Academy in London during the Life for Rent tour. The DVD release includes a bonus audio CD which contains twelve of the recorded tracks, in a slightly modified order.

Track listing

DVD track
"Stoned" – 5:58
"Here with Me" – 4:35
"See You When You're 40" – 5:55
"Life for Rent" – 3:55
"Hunter" – 4:16
"Isobel" – 4:48
"My Life" – 3:18
"Honestly OK" – 7:09
"Don't Leave Home" – 4:20
"Mary's in India" – 3:30
"Take My Hand" – 5:53
"Thank You" – 4:09
"Sand in My Shoes" – 5:17
"White Flag" – 4:16
"Do You Have a Little Time" – 2:43
"All You Want" – 3:55
"See the Sun" – 6:06

Bonus audio CD
"Stoned" – 5:58
"Here with Me" – 4:35
"See You When You're 40" – 5:55
"Life for Rent" – 3:55
"Isobel" – 4:48
"Honestly OK" – 7:09
"Take My Hand" – 5:53
"Thank You" – 4:09
"Mary's in India" – 3:30
"Sand in My Shoes" – 5:17
"White Flag" – 4:16
"See the Sun" – 6:06

Personnel
Dido – vocals
Vini Miranda – guitar
Keith Golden – bass guitar
John Deley – keyboards
Alex Alexander – drums
Jody Linscott – percussion

Certifications

See also
Dido discography
Life for Rent

References

External links 
 

Dido (singer) live albums
2005 live albums
2005 video albums
Live video albums
Albums recorded at the Brixton Academy